The 1954 Primera División Uruguaya was contested by 10 teams, and Peñarol won the championship.

League standings

References
Uruguay - List of final tables (RSSSF)

Uruguayan Primera División seasons
Uru
1954 in Uruguayan football